The BSI Challenger Lugano was a professional tennis tournament played on outdoor red clay courts. It has been part of the Association of Tennis Professionals (ATP) Challenger Tour. It was held annually in June at the Tennis Club Lido Lugano in Lugano, Switzerland, from 1999 until 2010.

In 2004 it was voted by ATP and players as the best tournament of its category, receiving the World Best Challenger Award.

Past finals

Singles

Doubles

References

External links
ITF search
Website on the ATP Challenger Tour

ATP Challenger Tour
Tretorn SERIE+ tournaments
Clay court tennis tournaments
Tennis tournaments in Switzerland
Defunct tennis tournaments in Europe
Defunct sports competitions in Switzerland